The Harley-Davidson LiveWire is an electric motorcycle by Harley-Davidson, their first electric vehicle.

The LiveWire, released in 2019, targets a different type of customer than their classic V-twin powered motorcycles.

In December 2021, the news was published that LiveWire would be spun-off from parent Harley Davidson, set to go public in the first half of 2022 as a SPAC (special-purpose acquisition company) valued at $1.77 billion.

History

The LiveWire was first displayed to the media in June 2014. Prototypes were made available for public test rides at US Harley-Davidson dealerships later in 2014, then Europe and Canada in 2015. The LiveWire was inspired by the "Mission R" electric superbike, and the powertrains for the prototypes were developed in collaboration with its manufacturer, the electric motorcycle and electric powertrain technology company Mission Motors.

As the prototype was unveiled in 2014, the motor was to be mounted longitudinally, under the frame. A bevel gear was planned to change the direction of rotation 90° to drive a gilmer belt to turn the rear wheel. In the prototypes, the bevel gear gave the drivetrain a unique whirring sound, compared to the sound of a jet turbine, or as a writer for The Verge said, "like an oversized vacuum".  According to Wired magazine in 2014, Mission Motors provided technical assistance on the motor controller.

In January 2018, Harley-Davidson announced that the motorcycle was entering production and would hit the market in 18 months. Preorders were planned for January 2019. The first deliveries were made in September 2019 but were temporarily halted due to an unspecified charging issue which Harley-Davidson resolved as of October 2019.

Harley-Davidson said Swiss rider Michel von Tell rode a LiveWire to an unofficial electric motorcycle distance-ridden-in-24-hours record in March 2020, covering . Von Tell, accompanied by local journalists, began in Zürich, Switzerland and rode to Stuttgart, Germany, continued along Lake Constance, and finished in Ruggell, Liechtenstein, in a total time of 23 hours and 48 minutes.

In 2020, the streaming video series Long Way Up followed Ewan McGregor and Charlie Boorman riding LiveWires from South America to North America. They traveled 13,000 miles, through 13 countries over 100 days.

In December 2021, Harley Davidson announced that it was spinning off its LiveWire division as a separate company called LiveWire, set to go public in the first half of 2022 as a special-purpose acquisition company  (SPAC) valued at $1.77 billion.

Reactions

When the electric motorcycle concept was unveiled in 2014, it was called "the most radical departure in the 111-year history of the brand" by a Fox Sports commentator. Other industry observers see the development of the LiveWire, and the potential development of an electric product or product line, as part of a shift towards "people who might not ordinarily be drawn to Harley's traditional loud, heavy, expensive motorcycles" and "the product of a painful corporate revolution long in the making" as Harley-Davidson uses new technology and markets to a wider customer base. The Milwaukee Journal Sentinel compared the LiveWire's styling to that of former Harley-Davidson sport bike subsidiary Buell.

The Hollywood Reporter noted that an electric Harley-Davidson could become a status symbol like the Tesla Model S, and that the new Harley-Davidson had been placed in Avengers: Age of Ultron. Road & Track posted spy shots from the set in 2014, and reported that Harley-Davidson would gauge the reception by the film's audience as a sort of global market test of the product concept.

Powersports Business said that initial customer reactions to test rides in New York in June 2014 were "overwhelmingly positive" but also noted some negative reactions to the tuning of the regenerative braking system.

Jalopnik said the LiveWire, at over $29,000, is "far too expensive" given the performance, range and charge specifications.

TechCrunch writer Jake Bright said the LiveWire pricing “was too damn high” but gave Harley Davidson props for an EV debut that “checked out as a legitimate e-motorcycle entrant” while “passing the sniff test” of the company’s traditional chrome and steel clientele -- “who aren’t exactly the Tesla crowd.”

Description
Technical specifications include:
 Motor: , longitudinal design,  torque
 Power transmission:  90 degree gearbox with belt-driven rear wheel
 Cooling system: liquid, shared by motor and controller
 Battery: ,  usable, Samsung cells, with 5-year, unlimited mileage warranty.
 Charging: supports Level 3 DC Fast Charging; comes with Level 1 charger that can be stored under the seat.
 17-inch front & rear wheels *Single disc, 2-piston front brake
 549 lbs in running order
 Cast aluminum frame and swingarm
 LED headlight
 TFT dashboard
 Trellis frame
 single speed powertrain

Performance
  in 3.0 seconds
  +1.9 seconds
 Top speed: 
 Range:

Notes

References

Further reading
 
  — interview with motorcycle designer Kirk Rasmussen

External links

 

Electric motorcycles
Livewire
Motorcycles introduced in 2019